Dora Amy Turnbull (formerly Dillon, née Elles; 15 October 1877 – 28 January 1961), known by pen name Patricia Wentworth, was a British crime fiction writer.

Early life and education
She was born in Mussoorie, British India, and was educated first privately, then at Blackheath High School for Girls in London. Her father was General Edmond Elles, and her mother was Clare, Lady Elles, nee Rothney.

Personal life
She and her first husband, Lt. Col. George Frederick Horace Dillon, had one daughter. She also became stepmother to Dillon's three sons, two of whom died during World War I. After Dillon's death, in 1906, she settled in Camberley, Surrey. In 1920, she married Lt. Col. George Oliver Turnbull. One of her stepsons who died in World War I had Wentworth as a middle name, after Wentworth Dillon, 4th Earl of Roscommon, and she adopted Wentworth as her pen name.

Dora Amy Turnbull died on 28 January 1961, aged 83. Her estate was valued at £24 561.

Career
Wentworth wrote a series of 32 crime novels in the classic whodunit style, featuring Miss Maud Silver, a retired governess and teacher who becomes a professional private detective, in London, England. Miss Silver works closely with Scotland Yard, especially Inspector Frank Abbott, and is fond of quoting the poet Tennyson. Miss Silver is sometimes compared to Jane Marple, the elderly detective created by Agatha Christie. "Miss Silver is well known in the better circles of society, and she finds entree to the troubled households of the upper classes with little difficulty.  In most of Miss Silver's cases there is a young couple whose romance seems ill fated because of the murder to be solved, but in Miss Silver's competent hands the case is solved, the young couple are exonerated, and all is right in this very traditional world." Wentworth also wrote 34 books outside that series. She won the Melrose prize in 1910 for her first novel A Marriage Under The Terror, set in the French Revolution. Her novels were the topic of Jariel D. O'Neil's 1988 doctoral dissertation.

Works

Miss Silver series 
 Grey Mask, 1928
 The Case Is Closed, 1937
 Lonesome Road, 1939
 Danger Point (USA: In the Balance), 1941
 The Chinese Shawl, 1943
 Miss Silver Intervenes (USA: Miss Silver Deals with Death), 1943
 The Clock Strikes Twelve, 1944
 The Key, 1944
 The Traveller Returns (USA: She Came Back), 1945
 Pilgrim's Rest (or: Dark Threat), 1946
 Latter End, 1947
 Spotlight (USA: Wicked Uncle), 1947
 The Case of William Smith, 1948
 Eternity Ring, 1948
 The Catherine Wheel, 1949
 Miss Silver Comes to Stay, 1949
 The Brading Collection (or: Mr Brading's Collection), 1950
 The Ivory Dagger, 1951
 Through the Wall, 1950
 Anna, Where Are You? (or: Death At Deep End), 1951
 The Watersplash, 1951
 Ladies' Bane, 1952
 Out of the Past, 1953
 The Silent Pool, 1954
 Vanishing Point, 1953
 The Benevent Treasure, 1953
 The Gazebo (or: The Summerhouse), 1955
 The Listening Eye, 1955
 Poison in the Pen, 1955
 The Fingerprint, 1956
 The Alington Inheritance, 1958
 The Girl in the Cellar, 1961

Frank Garrett series 
 Dead or Alive, 1936
 Rolling Stone, 1940

Ernest Lamb series 
 The Blind Side, 1939
 Who Pays the Piper? (USA: Account Rendered), 1940
 Pursuit of a Parcel, 1942

Benbow Smith 
 Fool Errant, 1929
 Danger Calling, 1931
 Walk with Care, 1933
 Down Under, 1937

Standalone 
 A Marriage under the Terror, 1910
 A Child's Rhyme Book, 1910
 A Little More Than Kin (or: More Than Kin), 1911
 The Devil's Wind, 1912
 The Fire Within, 1913
 Simon Heriot, 1914
 Queen Anne Is Dead, 1915
 Earl or Chieftain?, 1919
 The Astonishing Adventure of Jane Smith, 1923. Serialised, Baltimore Evening Sun, 1925
 The Red Lacquer Case, 1924. Serialised, Leicester Mail, 1926
 The Annam Jewel, 1924
 The Black Cabinet, 1925
 The Dower House Mystery, 1925
 The Amazing Chance, 1926. Serialised, Dundee Evening Telegraph, 1927
 Hue and Cry, 1927
 Anne Belinda, 1927
 Will-o'-the-Wisp, 1928
 Beggar's Choice, 1930
 The Coldstone, 1930
 Kingdom Lost, 1931
 Nothing Venture, 1932. Serialised, Dundee Courier, 1932
 What Became of Anne, 1926. Serialised, Dundee Courier, 1932
 Red Danger (USA: Red Shadow), 1932
 Seven Green Stones (USA: Outrageous Fortune), 1933
 Devil-in-the-Dark (USA: Touch And Go), 1934
 Fear by Night, 1934
 Red Stefan, 1935
 Blindfold, 1935
 Hole and Corner, 1936
 Mr Zero, 1938
 Afraid to Love, 1938. Serialised, Dundee Courier, 1932
 Run!, 1938
 Unlawful Occasions (USA: Weekend with Death), 1941
 Beneath the Hunter's Moon, Poems, 1945
 Silence in Court, 1947
 The Pool of Dreams: Poems, 1953

References

External links 

 
 
 
  Books by Wentworth.
  Three published magazine stories by Wentworth.
Patricia Wentworth: An Introduction and Series Guide at Early Bird Books

1878 births
1961 deaths
People from Camberley
People from Mussoorie
20th-century English novelists
English mystery writers
People educated at Blackheath High School
Women mystery writers
English women novelists
20th-century English women writers
20th-century pseudonymous writers
Pseudonymous women writers
British people in colonial India